Lutetium(III) oxide, a white solid, is a cubic compound of lutetium sometimes used in the preparation of specialty glasses. It is also called lutecia. It is a lanthanide oxide, also known as a rare earth.

History
In 1879, Swiss chemist Jean Charles Galissard de Marignac (1817–1894) claimed to have discovered ytterbium, but he had found a mixture of elements. In 1907, French chemist Georges Urbain (1872–1938) reported that ytterbium was a mixture of two new elements and was not a single element. Two other chemists, Carl Auer von Welsbach (1858–1929) and Charles James (1880–1926) also extracted lutetium(III) oxide around the same time. All three scientists successfully separated Marignac's ytterbia into oxides of two elements which were eventually named ytterbium and lutetium). None of these chemists were able to isolate pure lutetium. James' separation was of very high quality, but Urbain and  Auer von Welsbach published before him.

Uses
Lutetium(III) oxide is an important raw material for laser crystals. It also has specialized uses in ceramics, glass, phosphors, and lasers. Lutetium(III) oxide is used as a catalyst in cracking, alkylation, hydrogenation, and polymerization. The band gap of lutetium oxide is 5.5 eV.

References

Lutetium compounds
Sesquioxides